Leonard Martin (17 April 1919 – 21 August 1995) was an Australian results reader. He was known in the UK for reading out the football results, associated football pools statistics and horse-racing results on the BBC's Saturday afternoon sports programme, Grandstand.

Martin was born in Australia where he began his broadcasting career. He came to England on holiday in 1953 for the Coronation and received a call from the BBC the day before he was due to sail for Australia. He never used his return ticket home, and only twice went back to Australia in 1983 and 1993, on holiday. He performed his role on Grandstand from the programme's very first edition in 1958 until his death in 1995. Martin was well known for his intonation when reading the scores. It was clear from the way in which he presented the home or away team name, followed by number of goals, whether the result was a home win, an away win, a no-score draw or a score draw; this was important for the football pools results. He was succeeded by Tim Gudgin who also used the distinct BBC intonation.

In addition to his role on Grandstand, Martin was a voice-over artist heard on Movietone newsreels. He also used to run four flights of stairs at Lime Grove Studios in the late 1960s after Grandstand to introduce Simon Dee's programme, with 'Simon' elongated, in the distinctive manner.

External links

Death date

1919 births
1995 deaths
British sports broadcasters
Australian emigrants to England